Robert Damien Bale Croft MBE (born 25 May 1970) is a former Welsh cricketer who played international cricket for England. He is an off-spin bowler who played for Glamorgan and captained the county from 2003 to 2006. He retired from first class cricket at the end of the 2012 season, having played county cricket for 23 seasons. He commentates on cricket occasionally for Sky Sports.

Early life and education
Croft was born on 25 May 1970 in Morriston, Swansea.  He was educated at St John Lloyd's Roman Catholic Comprehensive School, Llanelli. He played rugby union as a scrum half for Llanelli RFC Under-11s. He studied at Swansea Metropolitan University.

Cricketing career
He made his England debut against Pakistan in 1996, and did enough to earn a touring place to Zimbabwe and New Zealand. In Christchurch, he took his Test best figures of 5–95 and his winter figures were a highly impressive 182.1–53–340–18. He played the first five tests of the 1997 Ashes series but was dropped for the final test, replaced by Phil Tufnell, after averaging 54 with the ball and showing a weakness to short-pitched fast bowling as a batsman. 

Around this time, Croft was involved in what ESPNCricinfo calls "an unsavoury, but in truth pretty harmless, pushing and finger-wagging incident" with Mark Ilott during the NatWest Trophy semi-final against Essex, which Glamorgan narrowly lost. However Croft had a happier experience that year in helping his county to their first County Championship in 28 years, Croft taking 54 wickets in Glamorgan's campaign at an average of 23.31. 

Croft toured the West Indies with England that winter, but in spite of taking six wickets in the fourth Test, it was the only Test he played that series. Restored to the England Test team the following summer, his last-wicket stand with Angus Fraser in the third Test of the 1998 series against South Africa saved England from an innings defeat, Croft personally scoring his highest Test score, 37 not out. Wisden observed that "England found an unlikely hero in Croft, who made up for three wicketless Tests by keeping his end intact for more than three hours". Croft was dropped for the next Test, although his innings helped to shift the momentum in the series, which England won. He enjoyed another relatively successful tour in Sri Lanka early in 2001, taking nine wickets at 28.66 as England won the three-match Test series. In general, Croft was a more effective Test bowler overseas, where he took 35 wickets in 9 Tests at 24.65, than in England, where he took 14 wickets in 12 Tests at 68.71.

His final Test match was the third Ashes Test of 2001 at Trent Bridge where he bowled just 3 overs. He was selected for the subsequent tour of India but he withdrew because of safety fears and was also selected for the 2003/04 tour of Sri Lanka but failed to play. After returning home, he announced his international retirement to concentrate on the captaincy of Glamorgan.

On 12 September 2006, after just two County Championship victories in 15 games thus far in the season, he announced his resignation from the captaincy, and was succeeded by David Hemp.

Exactly a year later, he passed 1,000 first-class wickets after dismissing Niall O'Brien; he became the first Welsh cricketer to take the double of 10,000 first-class career runs and 1,000 first-class career wickets. As of March 2022, he is the last cricketer anywhere to achieve this feat in first-class cricket, and with the increasing focus of higher-ability cricketers on limited-over forms of the game, he is likely to remain the last. In November 2007, he joined voices calling for a "clampdown" on Twenty20 problems with abusive crowds, after suffering abusive calls at Taunton Cricket Ground. On 1 August 2010 he got his first hat-trick against Gloucestershire to help Glamorgan win the match. It also made him the first Glamorgan spinner to take a hat-trick in 46 years.

Croft was once honoured as a druid at the Welsh cultural event, the National Eisteddfod.

He was appointed Member of the Order of the British Empire (MBE) in the 2013 New Year Honours for services to cricket.

In October 2018, Croft left his role as Glamorgan head coach.

England tours 
England 'A'
 West Indies 1992
 South Africa 1993/94

England 
 Zimbabwe / New Zealand 1996/97
 Sharjah / West Indies 1997/98
 Australia 1998/99
 Sri Lanka 2000/01 and 2003/04.

Team honours 
Glamorgan (1989 – 2012)

Champions
 County Championship: 1997
 National League: 1993, 2002, 2004
 National League Division 2:  2001

Individual honours 
 Glamorgan Cap: 1992
 Glamorgan Young Player of the Year: 1990, 1992
 Glamorgan Player of the Year: 1996, 2003, 2004, 2007
 St. Helen's Balconiers Player of the Year: 2007
 Glamorgan benefit season: 2000
 Glamorgan captain: 2003–2006
 The Weatherall Award: 2004 (for the leading all-rounder in English first-class game)
 Reached 1000 first class wickets for Glamorgan

Career best performances

Achievements
 First Welsh cricketer to score 10,000 runs and take 1,000 wickets in first-class cricket (2007)
 Elected to the Gorsedd of Bards

Books 
 Bennett, Androw and Croft, Robert (1995) Dyddiadur Troellwr  Y Lolfa, Talybont, Dyfed  
 Steen, Rob with Croft, Robert and Elliott, Matthew (1997) Poms and cobbers : the Ashes 1997 : an inside view  Andre Deutsch, London

References

External links
Cricinfo page on Robert Croft

1970 births
Living people
England One Day International cricketers
England Test cricketers
Welsh cricketers
Glamorgan cricketers
Glamorgan cricket captains
Glamorgan cricket coaches
Cricketers from Swansea
Alumni of Swansea Metropolitan University
Bards of the Gorsedd
Marylebone Cricket Club cricketers
Members of the Order of the British Empire
Conservative Party (UK) people
English cricket coaches
Test and County Cricket Board XI cricketers
Cricketers at the 1999 Cricket World Cup